WXCY-FM (103.7 FM) is a radio station in Havre de Grace, Maryland. Owned by Forever Media, it broadcasts a country music format serving the I-95 corridor from Wilmington, Delaware, to Baltimore, Maryland.

In 2019, Delmarva Broadcasting Company was acquired by Forever Media.

On January 1, 2021, the then-WXCY changed its call sign to WXCY-FM and began simulcasting on sister station WXCY and its translator W245CJ.

References

External links

Havre de Grace, Maryland
XCY-FM
XCY-FM
Radio stations established in 1975
1975 establishments in Maryland